Bluefish Caves is an archaeological site in Yukon, Canada, located  southwest of the Vuntut Gwichin community of Old Crow, from which a jaw bone of a Yukon horse, the extinct Equus lambei. It has been radiocarbon dated to 24,000 years before present (BP). There are three small caves in the area.

Context 
Bluefish Cave was initially known to the local First Nations, but was popularized by a fishing expedition in 1976, and later by researchers. The first cave contains various animal bones that appear to have been dragged there by predators; findings of cut marks may point to a human presence.

The Old Crow Flats, another important area with early human presence, are located about 75 km northeast of the Bluefish Caves.

Dating 
The site was excavated by archaeologist Jacques Cinq-Mars between 1977 and 1987, and the initial radiocarbon dating suggested an age of 24,000 before present (BP). This was considered controversial as it was in contrast to the Clovis-First theory, widely accepted by academics at the time, which considered the earliest settlement date of North America to be around 13,000 BP. A review of the site in 2017 found it to be 24,000 years old, lending support to the "Beringian standstill" hypothesis — that the ancestors of Native Americans spent considerable time isolated in a Beringian refuge during the Last Glacial Maximum before populating the Americas. A later paper questioned the dating (based on claimed disturbances) and the culturality of the faunal remains, but support for the 2017 study was reiterated by the author of that report.

See also 

 Beringia
 Pendejo Cave

References

Further reading 
 Heather Pringle (MARCH 8, 2017), What Happens When an Archaeologist Challenges Mainstream Scientific Thinking?—The story of Jacques Cinq-Mars and the Bluefish Caves shows how toxic atmosphere can poison scientific progress. Hakai Magazine, SMITHSONIAN.COM
 The Bluefish Caves in Beringian Prehistory by Jacques Cinq-Mars, Archaeological Survey of Canada

External links
Investigating Ice Age America’s Ancient Abattoir at Atlas Obscura, January 30, 2023

Archaeological sites in Yukon
Prehistory of the Arctic
Geography of Yukon
Pre-Clovis archaeological sites in the Americas
Caves of Canada